Sanvitalia procumbens with the common name of Mexican creeping zinnia is the type species of the genus Sanvitalia and a member of the family Asteraceae and tribe Heliantheae.

References

External links
 
 

Heliantheae